Young Justice is a fictional DC Comics superhero team.

Young Justice may also refer to:

 Young Justice (TV series), an American animated superhero TV series based on the comic, which technically is not a direct adaption of the Young Justice comic book series by Peter David, Todd Dezago, and Todd Nauck.
 Young Justice: Legacy, an action-adventure video game based on the television series
 Young Justice (rapper), an affiliate of the Wu-Tang Clan